Geoffrey Gunney  (9 November 1933 – 7 June 2018), also known by the nickname of "Mr. Hunslet", was an English professional rugby league footballer who played in the 1950s, 1960s and 1970s, and coached in the 1970s. Gunney then coached at club level for Wakefield Trinity.

Biography
Gunney was born in Armley, a suburb in the west of Leeds, West Riding of Yorkshire, his birth was birth registered in Leeds South district, he was a pupil at Dewsbury Road School, Hunslet, his funeral will take place at Cottingley Hall Crematorium, Cottingley, Leeds, LS11 0EU, at 1.40pm on Friday 22 June 2018.

Playing career
Gunney made his début for Hunslet in 1951. He would go on to spend his entire playing career with Hunslet. Gunney represented the Rest of the World in the 11–20 defeat by Australia at Sydney Cricket Ground on 29 June 1957. He represented Great Britain & France in the 37–31 victory over New Zealand at Carlaw Park, Auckland on 3 July 1957. Gunney played left-, i.e. number 11, for English League XIII while at Hunslet in the 8–26 defeat by France on Saturday 22 November 1958 at Knowsley Road, St. Helens. Gunney's Testimonial match at Hunslet took place in 1960.

Gunney won caps for Great Britain while at Hunslet in 1954 against New Zealand (3 matches), in 1956 against Australia, in 1957 against France (3 matches), in the 1957 Rugby League World Cup against France, and New Zealand, in 1964 against France, in 1965 against France. Gunney played right-, i.e. number 12, in Hunslet's 16–20 defeat by Wigan in the 1965 Challenge Cup Final at Wembley Stadium, London on Saturday 8 May 1965, in front of a crowd of 89,016. Gunney played right-, i.e. number 12, in Hunslet's 8–17 defeat by Bradford Northern in the 1965 Yorkshire Cup Final at Headingley Rugby Stadium, Leeds on Saturday 16 October 1965.

For the 1970 Birthday Honours Gunney was appointed a Member of the Order of the British Empire (MBE) for services to rugby league football. He had made 579 appearances for Hunslet at the time of his retirement in 1973..

Coaching career
Gunney was appointed as coach at Wakefield Trinity in August 1976, he was replaced by Brian Lockwood 3-months later in November 1976.

References

External links
!Great Britain Statistics at englandrl.co.uk (statistics currently missing due to not having appeared for both Great Britain, and England)
Pain of defeat serves Dewsbury well to prevent any repeat performance
(archived by archive.is) U.K. League Hooker in Doubt
(archived by web.archive.org) Records / Stats – - Hunslet Hawks
(archived by web.archive.org) Pictorial history of rugby league in Hunslet

1933 births
2018 deaths
English rugby league coaches
English rugby league players
Great Britain national rugby league team players
Hunslet F.C. (1883) players
Members of the Order of the British Empire
People from Armley
Rugby league players from Leeds
Rugby league second-rows
Wakefield Trinity coaches
Yorkshire rugby league team players